Daniela Infante (born 3 September 1980) is a Chilean field hockey player.

Daniela Infante is the oldest of four siblings, Camila, Denise and Paula, all of whom play international hockey for Chile.

Career
Infante debuted for the senior national team in 1999. Her first major tournament with the team was the 1999 Pan American Games.

Infante retired in 2011 after the Pan American Games in Guadalajara, Mexico. Chile won bronze at the tournament, their first Pan American Games medal.

References

1980 births
Living people
Chilean female field hockey players
South American Games silver medalists for Chile
South American Games medalists in field hockey
Pan American Games medalists in field hockey
Pan American Games bronze medalists for Chile
Field hockey players at the 2011 Pan American Games
Competitors at the 2006 South American Games
Medalists at the 2011 Pan American Games
20th-century Chilean women
21st-century Chilean women